Victor Kremer (31 July 1932 – 12 August 2010) was a Luxembourgian sports shooter. He competed at the 1960 Summer Olympics and the 1964 Summer Olympics.

References

1932 births
2010 deaths
Luxembourgian male sport shooters
Olympic shooters of Luxembourg
Shooters at the 1960 Summer Olympics
Shooters at the 1964 Summer Olympics
People from Hesperange
20th-century Luxembourgian people